Battle of Rawdat Muhanna ( or ) was a major battle of the Saudi–Rashidi War, during the unification of Saudi Arabia, fought between Rashidi and Saudi rebels. It occurred on 12 April 1906, in Muhanna's Gardens in Qassim region. After Ibn Saud's victory in Battle of Shinanah, Abdulaziz bin Mithab, better known as Ibn Rashid, planned to construct a new alliance with Qassimi leaders, Ibn Saud sent his troops with command of Ibrahim Ibn Aqeel to destroy this alliance before it grew. Ibn Aqeel's troops successfully killed Ibn Rashid in the battle along with hundreds of his Qassimi and Ottoman allies. Ibn Saud's victory in this battle ended the Ottoman presence in Nejd and Qassim by the end of October 1906.

References

1906 in Saudi Arabia
Rawdat Muhanna
Rawdat Muhanna